Bindarri National Park is a national park in New South Wales, Australia, 431 km northeast of Sydney.

It is considered the epicenter of biodiversity, due to the rare and endangered species found here, such as fish bone fern, southern quassia and palm orchid.

One of the natural beauties of this park is the mouth of the river Urumbilum, which, descending through the Great Escarpment, carved through spectacular waterfalls.

See also
 Protected areas of New South Wales

References

External links
 Official Site

National parks of New South Wales
Protected areas established in 1999
1999 establishments in Australia